Raumklang is a German classical music record label founded in 1993 by viola player and saxophonist Sebastian Pank and based in Leipzig. He is the son of Siegfried Pank.

Selected recordings
The label ranges from medieval to contemporary music. Several recordings have been noted by the press, musicologists, or won awards.
 Music of Georgia: Antchis Chati Chor: Georgische Reise (2004)

References

External links
raumklang.de

Classical music record labels